Big Shell Lake is a lake in the Canadian province of Saskatchewan. Big Shell Lake is in the RM of Spiritwood No. 496 and the resort villages of Big Shell and Echo Bay are on the south-eastern and eastern shore. Access to the lake and the villages is from Highway 12.

Big Shell Lake is the source of Shell River (formally Shell Brook). The lake's main inflow begins in the Thickwood Hills and flows east into the south-western corner of the lake.

Big Shell Lake Recreation Site 
Big Shell Lake Recreation Site is a provincial recreation site on the north-west corner of the lake. The park has a dock, boat launch, and a campground with 12 full-service campsites, two electrified sites, and one tenting site.

Fish species 
Fish commonly found in the lake include burbot, rainbow trout, northern pike, and walleye.

See also 
List of lakes of Saskatchewan
Tourism in Saskatchewan

References 

Lakes of Saskatchewan
Spiritwood No. 496, Saskatchewan